Victor Fleischer is a professor of law at University of California, Irvine School of Law known for raising awareness of the carried interest tax loophole.

Biography 
Fleischer grew up in Buffalo, New York, the son of now retired academics, and earned a B.A. from Columbia College in 1993 and a J.D. from Columbia Law School in 1996. He worked at Davis Polk & Wardwell and clerked for the U.S. Court of Appeals for the Fourth Circuit and Ninth Circuit before entering academia in 2001. He taught at the UCLA School of Law, University of Illinois College of Law, University of Colorado Law School, the University of San Diego School of Law, chairing the law school's tax programs, before joining the University of California, Irvine School of Law in 2018. His research has focused on the fields of tax policy and corporate tax.

Fleischer was known for his 2006 article, which highlighted the inequity of the tax treatment whereby private equity firms would classify the money it makes from on the future profits of their deals, also known as "carried interest," as capital gains, rather than as ordinary income, thereby paying a long-term capital gains tax rate that s 17 percentage points lower than the federal income tax rate. He argued that the loophole could cost the government as much as $130 billion over the next decade and said that the private equity industry should pay higher taxes, urging the U.S. government to fix the tax loophole. He was credited for popularizing the concept and turning into a political cause.

In 2016, Fleischer joined the United States Senate Committee on Finance staff as the co-chief tax counsel to the Democratic Party and served in that position until 2017.

Personal life 
Fleischer is married to Miranda Perry Fleischer, a professor of tax law at the University of San Diego.

References 

Living people
Columbia College (New York) alumni
Columbia Law School alumni
University of San Diego faculty
University of Illinois faculty
University of California, Irvine faculty
Davis Polk & Wardwell lawyers
American legal scholars
University of Colorado Law School faculty
UCLA School of Law faculty
Year of birth missing (living people)